Emil Reesen (30 May 1887 – 27 March 1964) was a Danish composer, conductor and pianist. Aside from composing for ballets and operas he was also a noted film score composer. He is remembered mainly for his operetta Farinelli (1942), which is still popular today.

Life
Emil Reesen studied with private tutors such as the composer Vilhelm Rosenberg and the pianist Siegfried Langgaard (a pupil of Franz Liszt). He made his debut as a concert pianist in 1911 and was employed as a conductor for the Danish Radio Symphony Orchestra in 1927. In 1931 he also began working as a ballet conductor at the Royal Danish Theatre. Later in his life he conducted the Vienna Symphony and recorded with the Berlin Philharmonic. Emil Reesen was the father of the composer Morten Reesen (1928–1961) and the great-uncle of the composer Frederik Magle (his sister's grandson).

Notable works
 1926 Rapsodien Himmerland
 1928 Variationer over et tema af Schubert
 1931 Gaucho, ballet
 1933 Gudindernes Strid, ballet
 1934 Zaporogerne, ballet
 1941 Trianon. Suite i gammel stil
 1941 Historien om en Moder, opera (Det kgl. Teater)
 1942 Farinelli, operetta (text: Mogens Dam)
 1948 Gadeprinsessen, operette
 1950 Video, fjernsynsballet
 1924 Lille Lise Let-på-Tå (Scalarevyen "Regnbuen")
 1925 Adrienne med sin luftantenne (Scalarevyen)
 1925 Roselille men uden mor (Scalarevyen)
 1925 Vil du sænke dit øje (Scalarevyen)
 1941 Et Flag er smukkest i Modvind (Poul Sørensen)
 1944 To som elsker hinanden (Viggo Stuckenberg)
 1948 Vuggevise (Mogens Kaarøe)

Film music
 1922 Häxan
 1937 Flådens blå matroser
 1937 Plat eller krone
 1940 En desertør
 1941 Niels Pind og hans dreng
 1941 En forbryder
 1943 Kriminalassistent Bloch
 1944 Familien Gelinde
 1944 Spurve under taget
 1946 Oktoberroser
 1948 Hvor er far ?
 1950 Din fortid er glemt

See also
List of Danish composers

External links
 
 Biography at Dansk Komponist Forening (Danish)

References

This article was initially translated from the Danish Wikipedia.

Danish classical composers
Danish male classical composers
Danish film score composers
Male film score composers
1887 births
1964 deaths
Danish conductors (music)
Male conductors (music)
20th-century classical composers
20th-century conductors (music)
Danish opera composers
Male opera composers
Danish classical pianists
Male classical pianists
20th-century classical pianists
20th-century Danish male musicians